List of the National Register of Historic Places listings in Hamilton County, New York

This is intended to be a complete list of properties and districts listed on the National Register of Historic Places in Hamilton County, New York.  The locations of National Register properties and districts (at least for all showing latitude and longitude coordinates below) may be seen in a map by clicking on "Map of all coordinates".  Two sites are further designated National Historic Landmarks and the entire county is included in another, the Adirondack Forest Preserve.



Listings county-wide

|}

See also

National Register of Historic Places listings in New York
List of National Historic Landmarks in New York

References

Hamilton County
Hamilton County, New York